Superband (Korean: 슈퍼밴드) is a South Korean talent show produced by JTBC in 2019, where indie musicians were invited to perform and eventually create a "superband", competing against each other. 

The average viewership rating was around 3%, and the show received positive and negative feedback, as well. The concept and its genre diversity was praised, while the media heavily criticised the lack of female participants. Only involving the viewers in the decision process at the end of the show drew criticism, as well.

Besides the winning band, the 2nd, 3rd, 5th and 6th place bands also signed with different production companies after the show.

The winner was Hoppipolla. The show was produced by the same production team of Phantom Singer and Hidden Singer.

Concept 
The show invited 121 indie musicians, from street performers to classical musicians, representing a variety of genres. The judges pre-selected a handful of participants, whose task was to create ad-hoc bands during the show and compete against each other. The main prize was a hundred million KRW, a recording contract, a world tour, and an SUV.

Out of the 121 participants, 53 were selected for the show, the pre-selection process was not aired. The selected musicians staged introductory performances during the first two episodes, during which some performances were only uploaded to an online platform. During the first two rounds, each stage consisted of one battle of two ad-hoc bands. 16 frontmen for these bands were picked by the judges (named 'Producers' in the show), the frontmen then picked their desired team members. A musician could only be picked for one team. Stages were evaluated by judges, who gave points for each performance. At the end of the rounds, weakest musicians from the losing teams of the battles were eliminated.

The show was mainly pre-produced and recorded, and broadcast heavily edited. The finals were aired live. During the finals, points from the first and second semi-finals (35%), online pre-voting (5%) and text message voting from viewers during the live broadcast (60%) decided final ranking.

Judges 
The judges, named "Producers" in the show:

Participants

Performances

Episodes 3–5: 1st round

Episodes 5–7: 2nd round

Episodes 8–9: 3rd round

Episodes 10–11: 4th round

Episode 12: 1st semi-final

Episode 13: 2nd semi-final

Episode 14: Final 
Finals were broadcast live and viewers could vote for each team via text message.

Reception 

The program was generally well-received by viewers, it got positive notes for not limiting genres, thus enabling the creation of a variety of ad-hoc bands. It was also highlighted that the show gave indie musicians a chance to shine, as they generally get less opportunities on television than popular Korean idols or trot singers. The show had an average viewership of around 3%, which is considered good for pay cable channels in South Korea.

On the other hand, the show received criticism that the production team decided to only accept male musicians and this was also a criterion in the call for participation. The background of this decision may have been the assumption that most viewers (and thus consumers) are women, and therefore the production aimed to create a male "superband". During the marketing, however, there was no mention of the show being male-only, only the creation of a band was highlighted, thus the original intention could be misinterpreted as if a band naturally could only be made up of men. The show enlisted only one woman, Lee Su-hyun of duo Akdong Musician, who was a member of the jury. Her role, however, was not well-perceived. Money Today noted that the very young singer (20 years old at the time) was much younger than other members of the jury, and had much less experience as an artist, as well. She was criticized for failing to judge participants' musicality or talent and rather show cutesy moves and praise their external appearances, as if representing female fans. The author of the article suggested that a more experienced female musician like Kim Yoon-ah of Jaurim fame could have been a better choice.

The show was also criticized for heavily relying on judges' decisions and only allowing viewers to choose at the end of the run.

Viewership ratings

Aftermath
The winner of the show, Hoppipolla signed with Dreamus Company and their first single was released in November 2019, titled "About Time". Second-place Lucy signed with Mystic Story of Yoon Jong-shin and released a single titled "Flowering" (Gaehwa,  개화) in May 2020. The original singer during the show re-joined his previous band Gift, and Lucy chose a new singer, Choi Sang-yeop (who was eliminated during the first round). Third-place finalist Purple Rain signed a contract with JTBC Studio and their single "The King Must Die" came out in February 2020.

References

External links 

 

JTBC original programming
Music competitions in South Korea
South Korean reality television series
South Korean music television shows
2019 South Korean television series debuts
2019 South Korean television series endings